Ayatollah Sayyid Muhammad-Ridha al-Husayni al-Sistani (born 18 August 1962), is an Iraqi-Iranian Shia scholar, and the son of Grand Ayatollah Ali al-Sistani.

Sistani primarily runs his father's office and oversees the financial and administrative work.

He firmly believes in Iraq's sovereignty and its right not to be interrupted by any foreign side, and only Iraqis have the right to choose the type of governance they want, again without the interference of any imposing foreign entity.

Early life and education

Early life 
al-Sistani was born to Sayyid Ali al-Sistani, and the daughter of Sayyid Muhammad-Hassan al-Shirazi (grandson of Mirza Shirazi). He comes a from a respectable lineage of scholars, traced back to the 17th century.

His family claim descent from the fourth Shia Imam, Ali ibn Husayn.

Education 
He joined the Najaf seminary in September, 1974, and studies under senior scholars such as Sheikh Hadi al-Askari, Sheikh Abbas al-Quchani, Sayyid Hasan al-Murtadhawi, Sheikh Mahdi Morvarid and Sayyid Ahmed al-Madadi. He conducted his jurisprudence studies under the leading jurist of his time, Sayyid Abu al-Qasim al-Khoei in September, 1979, until al-Khoei stopped teaching before he passed away. He attended the principles of jurisprudence classes of his father, Sayyid Ali al-Sistani, in March, 1991.

He began teaching manasik in September 2003, and continues til this day.

Political stances 
His position on recent developments in Iraq may have been allegedly close to the position of Iran, however, he has stated that any intervention is not designed to be permanent. He has also stated that he firmly believes in the sovereignty of Iraq and its right not to be interrupted by any foreign side, and only Iraqis have the right to choose the type of governance they want, again without the interference of any imposing foreign side.

He played a major role in ending the 2022 Baghdad clashes by calling Muqtada al-Sadr by phone and conveying a message to him from his father Ali al-Sistani, which stated that Sadr was responsible for any bloodshed and urged him to call on his group to end the violence. Sadr responded by ordering his forces to end their attacks, as well as apologizing for the violence that broke out.

Works 
Sistani has written a number of books in jurisprudence and principles of jurisprudence. Some of them include:

 Wasa'il al-Injab al-Sina'iya (Fertilization Through Assisted Technological Methods)
 Wasa'il al-Man' Min al-Injab (Contraceptive Methods)
 Janabat al-Mar'a Bighayr al-Muqaraba (Women's State of Impurity Without Intercourse)
 Zaawaj al-Bikr al-Rashida Bighayr Ithn al-Wali (Marriage of a Virgin Without Guardians Consent)
 Buhuth Fiqhiya (Jurispruedntial research regarding meat slaughter without the use of metal, veiling, beauty and other issues.)
 Buhuth Fi Sharh Manasik al-Hajj (Research in dissecting manasik of Hajj). 10 volumes.

See also 

 Ali al-Sistani
 Mirza Shirazi

References

External links 
 Library of al-Sistani's books by al-Feker E-book Network (in Arabic)

Living people
1962 births
Iraqi Islamic religious leaders
People from Mashhad
Islamic democracy activists
Shia scholars of Islam
Iraqi people of Iranian descent